Jabłeczna  is a village in the administrative district of Gmina Sławatycze, within Biała Podlaska County, Lublin Voivodeship, in eastern Poland, close to the border with Belarus.

The village has an approximate population of 320.

References

Villages in Biała Podlaska County